Developed from the reflecting circle, the repeating circle is an instrument for geodetic surveying, invented by Etienne Lenoir in 1784, while an assistant of Jean-Charles de Borda, who later improved the instrument. It was notable as being the equal of the great theodolite created by the renowned instrument maker, Jesse Ramsden. It was used to measure the meridian arc from Dunkirk to Barcelona by Jean Baptiste Delambre and Pierre Méchain (see: meridian arc of Delambre and Méchain).

Construction and operation 
The repeating circle is made of two telescopes mounted on a shared axis with scales to measure the angle between the two. The instrument combines multiple measurements to increase accuracy with the following procedure:

At this stage, the angle on the instrument is double the angle of interest between the points. Repeating the procedure causes the instrument to show 4× the angle of interest, with further iterations increasing it to 6×, 8×, and so on. In this way, many measurements can be added together, allowing some of the random measurement errors to cancel out.

See also 
 Reflecting circles
 Meridional definition
 Grade (angle)

References 

Surveying instruments